William Hilliard, also known as Hildyard was one of two Members of the Parliament of England for the constituency of York between 1586 and 1588.

Life and politics
William was the fourth son Martin Hilliard (Hildyard) of Winestead (Wynestede) in the East Riding of Yorkshire. He was educated at St John's College, Cambridge. He became a member of Inner Temple in 1560 and was called to the bar in 1571. He married Ann Howe with whom he had three sons, William (1577–1632), Christopher (born 1579) and Henry (born 1585).  His son William would be knighted and own lands in Bishop Wilton.

He became a freeman of the city of York in 1581 and was chosen to be the Recorder for the city on the eighth of January 1582 following the death of William Bernard. William was a Justice of the Peace for the East Riding of Yorkshire on three separate occasions. Due to his successful career, he acquired a large amount of land around the Beverley area. He was chosen to be MP for the city of York in 1586.

He died in 1608 and was buried at St Michael le Belfrey, York.

References

Members of the Parliament of England for constituencies in Yorkshire
1608 deaths